Myroslav Ivanovych Stupar (born August 27, 1941) is a Ukrainian retired footballer and football referee.

Career
As a player, he was a goalkeeper and played for Spartak Stanislav / Ivano-Frankivsk, FC Volyn Lutsk, Dinamo Khmelnytskyi, also for the FC Dynamo Kyiv reserves.

As a referee he officiated at about 150 matches of the Soviet Top League. Stupar twice refereed Soviet Cup finals (1979, 1981). He appeared 7 times in the Soviet annual best referees list.

He refereed the 1982 World Cup game in Valladolid, Spain, between France and Kuwait. France were leading 3-1 when their midfielder Alain Giresse broke through to score a fourth goal. The Kuwaiti players protested, claiming that they had stopped playing because they had heard a whistle from the crowd and thought it was the referee blowing. Stupar ended up disallowing Giresse's goal and the game resumed with a dropped-ball at the spot where it was believed the game stopped at the whistle. France ended up winning 4–1.

External links
  Profile
  Verbytsky, I. Myroslav Stupar: After ending my playing career, I could not visit a stadium for three months (Мирослав Ступар: Завершивши кар’єру, не міг відвідувати стадіон впродовж трьох місяців). UA-Football. 20 January 2014.

1941 births
Living people
FC Podillya Khmelnytskyi players
Ukrainian football referees
Soviet football referees
FIFA World Cup referees
1982 FIFA World Cup referees
Ukrainian footballers
Soviet footballers
FC Spartak Ivano-Frankivsk players
Vasyl Stefanyk Subcarpathian National University alumni
Association football goalkeepers
Sportspeople from Ivano-Frankivsk